Getting On is a satirical British sitcom based on a geriatric ward in an NHS hospital. It is written by its core cast, Jo Brand, Vicki Pepperdine, and Joanna Scanlan. Series 1 and 2 were directed by Peter Capaldi, who also appears as Dr. Healy. It first aired in July 2009, for three episodes. The second series of six episodes aired in 2010, with the third series (also of six episodes) airing in late 2012. Despite strong critical acclaim, the show was not recommissioned for a fourth series. It was shot in the closed Plaistow Hospital.

A U.S. version of Getting On began airing on HBO in November 2013 and concluded in December 2015.

A three-part spin-off series, Going Forward, was announced in March 2016 and began airing in May 2016 on BBC Four.

Characters 

Kim Wilde, played by Jo Brand, is a return-to-work nurse who must adapt to the difficulties the modern NHS throws at her, with C. diff, form-filling, and political correctness. She is the staff member most empathetic to the concerns of patients and their families, which often brings her into conflict with her colleagues, who are more concerned with sticking to the rules. She appears to be happily married to Dave, with several children, though her life outside the ward is rarely touched upon.
Dr Pippa Moore, played by Vicki Pepperdine, is the "tough but fair" Care of The Elderly Consultant. She is uptight, self-centred, and lacking in "people skills", often being discourteous to her colleagues, her medical students, and even the patients. She, however, remains oblivious to the offence she causes, believing that people are impressed by her professionalism. At the start of the series, she is married to a pilot called Philip but the marriage is not happy. She has something of a crush on her psychiatrist colleague, Dr Healy, but he has no feelings for her. 
Denise "Den" , played by Joanna Scanlan, is the ward sister and Wilde's immediate superior. She is legally separated from her husband. 
Hilary Loftus, played by Ricky Grover, is the male matron. He has a relationship with Den, which is complicated by the fact that he is clearly inexperienced in romantic relationships, as well as identifying as homosexual.

Reception 
The show has received very high praise from television critics across the board in the UK, with praise for the actors' performances, and the gritty, realistic portrayal of an NHS hospital. The Telegraph listed it as the best British television show of the year.

Brand, Scanlan, and Pepperdine won the 2010 Royal Television Society Award for Best Writing in Comedy. and in 2010 the three also won the Writer's Guild Award for Best Comedy.

Both Jo Brand and Joanna Scanlan were nominated for the 2010 BAFTA Television Award for Best Female Performance in a Comedy Role. Jo Brand won the BAFTA for her performance in 2011.

For the third series, Brand, Scanlan and Pepperdine were nominated for the 2012 Royal Television Society Award and the BAFTA Award for Best Writing in Comedy.

Episodes
{| class="wikitable plainrowheaders" style="text-align: center;"
|-
! scope="col" style="padding: 0 8px;" colspan="2" rowspan="2"| Season
! scope="col" style="padding: 0 8px;" rowspan="2"| Episodes
! scope="col" colspan="2"| Originally aired 
! scope="col" rowspan="2"| Ave. UK viewers
|-
! scope="col" | First aired
! scope="col" | Last aired
|-
 |scope="row" style="background: #470222;"|
 |1
 |3
 |style="padding: 0 8px;"|
 |style="padding: 0 8px;"|
 | 577,000
|-
 |scope="row" style="background: #57A2A6;"|
 |2
 |6
 |style="padding: 0 8px;"|
 |style="padding: 0 8px;"|
 | 
|-
 |scope="row" style="background: #FF6052;"|
 |3
 |6
 |style="padding: 0 8px;"|
 |style="padding: 0 8px;"|
 | 494,000
|-
|}

Series 1 (2009)

Series 2 (2010)

Series 3 (2012)

Home video releases
All three series of Getting On have been released on DVD via 2entertain distribution. "Series One" was released on 7 September 2009, while "Series Two" was released 6 December 2010. Following this, a box set containing both "Series One" and "Series Two" was released on 6 December 2010. "Series Three" received its release on 26 November 2012. A complete series box set containing all three series was made available on 26 November 2012.

In Australia, the "Complete Series 1 & 2" was released on 7 July 2011 via Roadshow distribution. As of yet, the third series has not been released in Australia.

References

External links

2009 British television series debuts
2012 British television series endings
2000s British black comedy television series
2000s British medical television series
2000s British sitcoms
2000s British workplace comedy television series
2010s British black comedy television series
2010s British medical television series
2010s British sitcoms
2010s British workplace comedy television series
BBC black comedy television shows
BBC high definition shows
BBC medical television shows
BBC television sitcoms
English-language television shows
Television series about old age